PM2FHN (old call sign: PM3FHN, 95.1 FM), on air name Kis FM, is a Jakarta radio station. It features slow adult contemporary. The channel is owned by Mahaka Radio Integra (MARI). Kis FM targets women and children with its off-air activation and kids show on weekdays.

History 
Kis FM started in Gandul, Cinere, Bogor (now part of Depok) in 1991. It is the youngest of Ramako group radio stations. Since its creation in 1991, it targeted young adults with consistent programming from the 1990s to its 2000 acquisition by MARI.

In June 2003, Kis 107.2 return with old program such as Wednesday Slow Machine, now as Kis Love Machine on Friday, Rock Weekend previously aired on Kis, now on Most Radio  every Saturday.

Slogans
 The Intelligent Choice (1992-2001)
 Jakarta's Best Mix (2001-2017)
 Jakarta's Best Chill and Relax Music (2017-present)
 The Best 90's music in Jakarta (2017-present) (second slogan)

References

Adult contemporary radio stations
Radio stations in Jakarta
1990s-themed radio stations
Radio stations established in 1991
Mahaka Media